The 2018 United States House of Representatives elections in Ohio were held on November 6, 2018, to elect the 16 U.S. representatives from the U.S. state of Ohio, one from each of the state's 16 congressional districts. The elections coincided with other elections to the House of Representatives, elections to the United States Senate, and various state and local elections.

Results summary

Statewide

District
Results of the 2018 United States House of Representatives elections in Ohio by district:

District 1

The 1st district is based in Cincinnati, stretching southwestward to Ohio's borders with Kentucky and Indiana. Incumbent Republican Steve Chabot was re-elected with 59% of the vote in 2016. He was challenged by attorney and Hamilton County Clerk of Courts Aftab Pureval.

Republican primary

Candidates

Nominee
 Steve Chabot, incumbent U.S. Representative

Eliminated in primary
 Samuel Ronan, United States Air Force veteran, 2016 State House candidate and candidate for chair of the Democratic National Committee in 2017

Primary results

Democratic primary

Candidates

Nominee
 Aftab Pureval, attorney and Hamilton County Clerk of Courts

Withdrawn
 Robert Barr, rabbi
 Laura Ann Weaver, dentist

Declined
 Eric Elias, businessman
Mark W. Lippert, former United States Ambassador to South Korea
Todd Portune, Hamilton County Commissioner
Alicia Reece, state representative
P.G. Sittenfeld, Member of Cincinnati City Council and candidate for U.S. Senate in 2016
Michele Young, attorney, author and nominee for this seat in 2016

Campaign
Pureval raised $660,000 in the first eight weeks after announcing his candidacy with nearly 80% of the money from people local to the district. This his campaign team claimed is more than any Democratic challenger had raised in a single quarter against Chabot.

Endorsements

Primary results

General election

Campaign
Despite being the strongest challenger to Chabot since his congressional comeback in 2010, the Pureval campaign was hit with two significant controversies that impacted their chances.

Firstly, he was accused of spending funds from his clerk campaign account on expenances in relation to his house campaign, in violation of Ohio election law. The Ohio Elections Commission dismissed 28 of 29 charges brought against the campaign, before issuing them a $100 fine for the single upheld charge (which had been caused by a clerical error).

Secondly, a 22-year-old Pureval volunteer managed to infiltrate the Chabot campaign and gain access a sensitive voter database. After the election Pureval would "take responsibility" for the volunteer's actions and formally apologized to Chabot.

Endorsements

Polling

Predictions

Results

District 2

The 2nd district takes eastern Cincinnati and its suburbs, including Norwood and Loveland, and stretches eastward along the Ohio River. The incumbent is Republican Brad Wenstrup, who has represented the district since 2013. Wenstrup was re-elected with 65% of the vote in 2016.

Republican primary

Candidates

Nominee
 Brad Wenstrup, incumbent U.S. Representative

Primary results

Democratic primary

Candidates

Nominee
 Jill Schiller, former special assistant in the White House Office of Management and Budget

Eliminated in primary
 Janet Everhard, retired physician and write-in candidate fot this seat in 2016
 Ken McNeely, Brown County Democratic Party central committee chairman

Withdrawn
 Richard L. Crosby, attorney

Declined
 Jerry Springer, talk show host, former Mayor of Cincinnati, nominee for OH-02 in 1970 and candidate for governor in 1982
 William R. Smith, perennial candidate

Endorsements

Primary results

General election

Endorsements

Polling

Results

District 3

The 3rd district, located entirely within the borders of Franklin County, taking in inner Columbus, Bexley, Whitehall, as well as Franklin County's share of Reynoldsburg. The incumbent is Democrat Joyce Beatty, who has held the district since 2013. Beatty was re-elected with 69% of the vote in 2016.

Democratic primary

Candidates

Nominee
 Joyce Beatty, incumbent U.S. Representative

Primary results

Republican primary

Candidates

Nominee
 Jim Burgess

Eliminated in primary
 Abdulkadir M. Haji

Primary results

General election

Results

District 4

The 4th district, nicknamed the "duck district", sprawls from the Columbus exurbs, including Marion and Lima into north-central Ohio, taking in Oberlin. The incumbent is Republican Jim Jordan, who has represented the district since 2007. Jordan was re-elected with 68% of the vote in 2016.

Republican primary

Candidates

Nominee
 Jim Jordan, incumbent U.S. Representative

Eliminated in primary
 Joseph Miller

Primary results

Democratic primary

Candidates

Nominee
 Janet Garrett, retired teacher and nominee for this seat in 2014 & 2016

Eliminated in primary
 Cody James Slatzer-Rose, software developer

Primary results

General election

Endorsements

Polling

Results

District 5

The 5th district encompasses Northwestern Ohio, taking in Findlay, Defiance, and Bowling Green. The incumbent is Republican Bob Latta, who has represented the district since 2007. Latta was re-elected with 71% of the vote in 2016.

Republican primary

Candidates

Nominee
 Bob Latta, incumbent U.S. Representative

Eliminated in primary
 Bob Kreienkamp
 Todd Wolfrum, Van Wert County Commissioner

Primary results

Democratic primary

Candidates

Nominee
 J. Michael Galbraith, Bowling Green State University teacher

Eliminated in primary
 James L. Neu, Jr.,employee of Chrysler's Toledo machining plant and nominee for this seat in 2016+

Primary results

General election

Results

District 6

The 6th district encompasses Appalachian Ohio, including Steubenville, Marietta, and Ironton. The incumbent is Republican Bill Johnson, who has represented the district since 2011. Johnson was re-elected with 71% of the vote in 2016.

Republican primary

Candidates

Nominee
 Bill Johnson, incumbent U.S. Representative

Eliminated in primary
 Robert Blazek, businessman

Primary results

Democratic primary

Candidates

Nominee
 Shawna Roberts, Belmont County resident and former small business owner

Eliminated in primary
 Werner Lange, former delegate for Bernie Sanders

Primary results

General election

Results

District 7

The 7th district is based in northeastern Ohio, and includes the city of Canton. The incumbent is Republican Bob Gibbs, who has represented the district since 2013. Gibbs was re-elected with 64% of the vote in 2016.

Republican primary

Candidates

Nominee
 Bob Gibbs, incumbent U.S. Representative

Eliminated in primary
 Terry Robertson, truck driver, real estate agent and candidate for this seat 2016
 Patrick Quinn, internet technician

Primary results

Democratic primary

Candidates

Nominee
 Ken Harbaugh, United States Navy veteran and president of Team Rubicon Global

Eliminated in primary
 Patrick Pikus, manager at The Timken Company

Primary results

General election

Polling

Predictions

Results

District 8

The 8th district takes in the northern suburbs of Cincinnati, including Butler County, as well as taking in Springfield. The incumbent is Republican Warren Davidson, who has represented the district since 2016. Davidson was re-elected with 69% of the vote in 2016.

Republican primary

Candidates

Nominee
 Warren Davidson, incumbent U.S. Representative

Primary results

Democratic primary

Candidates

Nominee
 Vanessa Enoch, management consultant

Eliminated in primary
 Bill Ebben
 Matthew J. Guyette, paralegal
 Ted Jones

Primary results

General election

Results

District 9

The 9th district spans the coast of Lake Erie from Toledo to the west side of Cleveland, taking in Port Clinton, Sandusky, Lorain, Lakewood, Brook Park, and Brooklyn. The incumbent is Democrat Marcy Kaptur, who has represented the district since 1983. Kaptur was re-elected with 69% of the vote in 2016.

Democratic primary

Candidates

Nominee
 Marcy Kaptur, incumbent U.S. Representative

Eliminated in primary
 Joshua Garcia, taxi driver

Primary results

Republican primary

Candidates

Nominee
 Steve Kraus, former state representative and convicted felon

Eliminated in primary
 Keith Colton
 W. Benjamin Franklin

Primary results

General election

Results

District 10

The 10th district encompasses the Dayton metro area, including Dayton and the surrounding suburbs. The incumbent is Republican Mike Turner, who has represented the district since 2013. Turner was re-elected with 64% of the vote in 2016.

Democratic primary

Candidates

Nominee
 Theresa Gasper, business owner

Eliminated in primary
 Robert Klepinger
 Michael Milisits

Primary results

Republican primary

Candidates

Nominee
 Mike Turner, incumbent U.S. Representative

Eliminated in primary
 John Anderson, civilian air force acquisition logistics and sustainment manager and candidate for this seat in 2012 & 2014
 John Mitchell

Primary results

General election

Endorsements

Predictions

Results

District 11

The 11th district takes in eastern Cleveland and its suburbs, including Euclid, Cleveland Heights, and Warrensville Heights, as well as stretching southward into Richfield and parts of Akron. The incumbent is Democrat Marcia Fudge, who has represented the district since 2008. Fudge was re-elected with 80% of the vote in 2016.

Democratic primary

Candidates

Nominee
 Marcia Fudge, incumbent U.S. Representative

Primary results

Republican primary

Candidates

Nominee
 Beverly Goldstein, former university professor and nominee for this seat in 2016

Eliminated in primary
 Gregory P. Dunham

Primary results

General election

Results

District 12

The 12th district encompasses the northern Columbus metro area, taking in the northern Columbus suburbs, including Dublin, Westerville, Gahanna, and New Albany, as well as, Newark, Mansfield, and Zanesville. Republican Pat Tiberi was the representative of the district until his resignation on January 15, 2018. A special election was held on August 7, 2018, to fill the vacancy until January 3, 2019.

Republican primary

Nominee 
 Troy Balderson, state senator and former state representative

Eliminated in primary 
 John Adams, perennial candidate
 Kevin Bacon, state senator
 Lawrence Cohen, attorney
 Jon Halverstadt, real estate investor
 Tim Kane, conservative economist
 Melanie Leneghan, Liberty Township Trustee
 Pat Manley
 Carol O'Brien, Delaware County Prosecutor
 Myrl Shoemaker, Jr., son of former lieutenant governor Myrl Shoemaker

Declined
Andrew Brenner, state representative (running for state senate)
Anne Gonzales, state representative (running for state senate)
John Kasich, Governor and former U.S. Representative
Clarence Mingo, Franklin County Auditor (endorsed Kevin Bacon)
J. D. Vance, author and venture capitalist

Democratic primary

Candidates

Nominee
 Danny O'Connor, Franklin County Auditor

Eliminated in primary
 Ed Albertson, businessman and candidate for this seat 2016
 Jackie Patton, nurse
 John Peters, teacher
 John Russell, farmer
 Zach Scott, former Franklin County Sheriff and candidate for Mayor of Columbus in the 2015
 Doug Wilson, healthcare professional

Primary results

General election

Endorsements

Polling

Predictions

Results

District 13

The 13th district covers the Mahoning Valley in northeastern Ohio, including Youngstown and eastern parts of Akron. The incumbent is Democrat Tim Ryan, who has represented the district since 2013. Ryan was re-elected with 68% of the vote in 2016.

Democratic primary

Candidates

Nominee
 Tim Ryan, incumbent U.S. Representative

Eliminated in primary
 Robert Crow
 John Stephen Luchansky, perennial candidate

Primary results

Republican primary

Candidates

Nominee
 Chris DePizzo, attorney

Primary results

General election

Results

District 14

The 14th district is located in Northeast Ohio, taking in the eastern suburbs and exurbs of Cleveland, including Mayfield Heights, Solon, and Independence, as well as Ashtabula, Lake, and Geauga counties, northern Portage County, and northeastern Summit County. The incumbent is Republican David Joyce, who has represented the district since 2013. Joyce was re-elected with 63% of the vote in 2016.

Republican primary

Candidates

Nominee
 David Joyce, incumbent U.S. Representative

Primary results

Democratic primary

Candidates

Nominee
 Betsy Rader, attorney

Primary results

General election

Endorsements

Predictions

Results

District 15

The 15th district encompasses the southern Columbus metro area, taking in the western and eastern suburbs of Columbus, including Upper Arlington, Hilliard, and Grove City, as well as Athens. The incumbent is Republican Steve Stivers, who has represented the district since 2011. Stivers was re-elected with 66% of the vote in 2016.

Republican primary

Candidates

Nominee
 Steve Stivers, incumbent U.S. Representative

Primary results

Democratic primary

Candidates

Nominee
 Rick Neal, former Peace Corps volunteer and international aid worker

Eliminated in primary
 Rob Jarvis, high school government teacher

Primary results

Independents
 Johnathan Miller (Libertarian)

Notes

General election

Endorsements

Predictions

Results

District 16

The 16th district takes in the western suburbs of Cleveland, including Westlake, Parma, and Strongsville, as well Medina, Norton, and North Canton. The incumbent is Republican Jim Renacci, who has represented the district since 2011. Renacci was re-elected with 65% of the vote in 2016. Renacci is running for U.S. Senate instead of re-election in 2018.

Republican primary

Candidates

Nominee
 Anthony Gonzalez, former NFL player

Eliminated in primary
 Christina Hagan, state representative
 Michael Grusenmeyer, physician

Withdrawn
 Darrell Hartman 
 Tom Patton, state representative and former State Senator

Declined
 Ron Amstutz, Wayne County Commissioner and former state representative
 Rob Frost, Chairman of the Cuyahoga County Republican Party
 Frank LaRose, State Senator (running for Secretary of State)
 Larry Obhof, President of the Ohio Senate
Jim Renacci, incumbent U.S. Representative (running for U.S. Senate)
 Kristina Roegner, state representative
 Mary Taylor, Lieutenant Governor of Ohio (running for Governor)
 Jane Timken, Chairman of the Ohio Republican Party
 Scott Wiggam, state representative

Endorsements

Primary results

Democratic primary

Candidates

Nominee
 Susan Moran Palmer, health industry professional

Eliminated in primary
 Mark Dent, attorney and U.S. Army Veteran
 Aaron Godfrey, scientist
 Grant Goodrich, head of the Great Lakes Energy Institute at Case Western Reserve University and U.S. Marine Corp veteran 
 Jennifer Herold, occupational therapist
 T.J. Mulloy, insurance and investment broker
 John Wilson

Declined
 Dean DePiero, former Mayor of Parma and former state representative
 Betty Sutton, former Administrator of the Saint Lawrence Seaway Development Corporation and former U.S. Representative (running for Lieutenant Governor)

Primary results

General election

Polling

Predictions

Results

See also
 2018 United States House of Representatives elections
 2018 United States elections

References

External links
Candidates at Vote Smart 
Candidates at Ballotpedia 
Campaign finance at FEC 
Campaign finance at OpenSecrets

Official campaign websites of first district candidates
Steve Chabot (R) for Congress
Aftab Pureval (D) for Congress

Official campaign websites of second district candidates
Jill Schiller (D) for Congress
Brad Wenstrup (R) for Congress

Official campaign websites of third district candidates
Joyce Beatty (D) for Congress
Jim Burgess (R) for Congress

Official campaign websites of fourth district candidates
Janet Garrett (D) for Congress
Jim Jordan (R) for Congress

Official campaign websites of fifth district candidates
J. Michael Galbraith (D) for Congress
Bob Latta (R) for Congress

Official campaign websites of sixth district candidates
Shawna Roberts (D) for Congress
Bill Johnson (R) for Congress

Official campaign websites of seventh district candidates
Ken Harbaugh (D) for Congress
Bob Gibbs (R) for Congress

Official campaign websites of eighth district candidates
Warren Davidson (R) for Congress
Vanessa Enoch (D) for Congress

Official campaign websites of ninth district candidates
Marcy Kaptur (D) for Congress
Steve Kraus (R) for Congress

Official campaign websites of tenth district candidates
Theresa Gasper (D) for Congress
Mike Turner (R) for Congress

Official campaign websites of eleventh district candidates
Marcia Fudge (D) for Congress
Beverly A. Goldstein (R) for Congress

Official campaign websites of twelfth district candidates
Troy Balderson (R) for Congress
Danny O'Connor (D) for Congress

Official campaign websites of thirteenth district candidates
Tim Ryan (D) for Congress
Chris DePizzo (R) for Congress

Official campaign websites of fourteenth district candidates
Betsy Rader (D) for Congress
David Joyce (R) for Congress

Official campaign websites of fifteenth district candidates
Johnathan Miller (L) for Congress
Rick Neal (D) for Congress
Steve Stivers (R) for Congress

Official campaign websites of sixteenth district candidates
Anthony Gonzalez (R) for Congress
Susan Moran Palmer (D) for Congress

Ohio
2018
United States House of Representatives